The Seattle Mariners' 1999 season was their 23rd since the franchise creation, and ended the season finishing 3rd in the American League West with a  record. In July, after 39 home games at the Kingdome, they moved into Safeco Field, and the Kingdome was demolished eight months later.

Offseason
 November 9, 1998: Paul Spoljaric was traded by the Mariners to the Philadelphia Phillies for Mark Leiter.
 November 22, 1998: Butch Huskey was signed as a free agent with the Seattle Mariners.
 December 30, 1998: John Mabry was signed as a free agent by the Mariners.

Regular season
 July 15, 1999: Immediately after the All-Star break, the Mariners played their first game at Safeco Field, but lost to the San Diego Padres 3–2 with 44,607 in attendance. It was the first park in Major League history to host an interleague game on its inaugural day.

Season standings

Record vs. opponents

Notable transactions
 April 27, 1999: Rafael Bournigal was purchased by the Mariners from the Texas Rangers.
 July 26, 1999: Butch Huskey was traded by the Mariners to the Boston Red Sox for Robert Ramsay.
 August 28, 1999: Mike Blowers was signed as a free agent by the Mariners.

Draft picks
 June 2, 1999: 1999 Major League Baseball Draft
J. J. Putz was drafted by the Mariners in the 6th round. Player signed June 17, 1999.
Termel Sledge was drafted by the Seattle Mariners in the 8th round of the 1999 amateur draft. Player signed June 18, 1999.
Rich Harden was drafted by the Mariners in the 38th round, but did not sign.

Roster

Player stats

Batting

Starters by position
Note: Pos = Position; G = Games played; AB = At bats; H = Hits; Avg. = Batting average; HR = Home runs; RBI = Runs batted in

Other batters
Note: G = Games played; AB = At bats; H = Hits; Avg. = Batting average; HR = Home runs; RBI = Runs batted in

Pitching

Starting pitchers
Note: G = Games pitched; IP = Innings pitched; W = Wins; L = Losses; ERA = Earned run average; SO = Strikeouts

Other pitchers
Note: G = Games pitched; IP = Innings pitched; W = Wins; L = Losses; ERA = Earned run average; SO = Strikeouts

Relief pitchers
Note: G = Games pitched; W = Wins; L = Losses; SV = Saves; ERA = Earned run average; SO = Strikeouts

Farm system

References

External links
1999 Seattle Mariners at Baseball Reference
1999 Seattle Mariners team page at www.baseball-almanac.com

Seattle Mariners seasons
Seattle Marin
Seattle Mariners